Boztepe (literally "grey hill" or "blemished hill") is a Turkish place name that may refer to:

People
Mehmet Boztepe (born 1988), Turkish footballer

Places
Boztepe Dam (Tokat), a dam in Tokat Province, Turkey
Boztepe Dam (Malatya), a dam in Malatya Province, Turkey
Boztepe hill, Trabzon, a hill near Trabzon, Trabzon Province, Turkey
Boztepe, Adıyaman, a village in Adıyaman district, Adıyaman Province, Turkey
Boztepe, Keşan
Boztepe, Kırşehir, a town and district of Kırşehir Province, Turkey 
Boztepe, Manavgat, a village in the Manavgat district, Antalya Province, Turkey
Boztepe, Ordu, a village (and the name of a nearby hill) in Ordu Province, Turkey
Boztepe, Sungurlu
Boztepe, Tarsus, a village in Tarsus district of Mersin Province, Turkey
Boztepe, Uğurludağ
Boztepe, Yüreğir, a village in Yüreğir district, Adana Province, Turkey

Turkish-language surnames